Turbo-Hydramatic 425 (TH425 or THM 425, later 325) was an automatic transmission developed and produced by General Motors. The THM425 was a derivative of the THM400; most parts directly interchange and some others will interchange with minor modifications. The internal parts spin the opposite direction in the THM425; the helical angle of the planetary gears is "reversed" and the one-way clutches freewheel in the opposite direction, for example. The THM425 was developed for the 1966 Oldsmobile Toronado and the 1967 Cadillac Eldorado. A lighter-duty transmission known as the THM325 (using components sourced from the THM200) replaced the THM425 in both car lines after the 1978 model year. 1979 and later longitudinal engine front-wheel drive vehicles used the THM325. The THM325 became the THM325-4L with an overdrive added in 1982, but all vehicles using this transmission switched to more-conventional transverse engine mounting in 1986. Bellhousing pattern used the 1967-90 Buick-Oldsmobile-Pontiac-Cadillac V8 pattern throughout its entire lifecycle. 

Applications:
 THM425
 1971–1979 Cortez Motor Home
 1966–1978 Oldsmobile Toronado
 1967–1978 Cadillac Eldorado
 1973–1978 GMC Motorhome
 1973–1978 GMC TransMode multi-purpose vehicle
 1972–1978 Revcon motorhome
 1989–1993 Vector W8
 THM325
 1979–1981 Cadillac Eldorado
 1979–1981 Oldsmobile Toronado
 1980–1981 Cadillac Seville
 THM325-4L
 1982–1985 Buick Riviera
 1982–1985 Cadillac Eldorado
 1982–1985 Cadillac Seville
 1982–1985 Oldsmobile Toronado

See also
 Cadillac Eldorado
 List of GM transmissions

References

External links
Troubleshooting manual (1969)

General Motors transmissions